Queen Mother Sangay Choden (born 11 May 1963) is one of the four wives and queens of Bhutanese king Jigme Singye Wangchuck, who ruled in Bhutan from 1972 until his abdication in 2006. She is the Queen Mother (Gyalyum Kude, literally meaning "Queen Mother") of Bhutan.

Biography 
Her father, Yab Dasho Ugyen Dorji (1925–2019), was the Founder and Proprietor of Ugyen Academy (03/04/2002). Her mother is Yum Thuiji Zam (b. 1932).

She was educated at St. Joseph's Convent, Kalimpong, and St. Helen's School, Kurseong, India.

Her three brothers are:

 Lyonpo Sangay Ngedup (b. 1953), former Prime Minister of Bhutan.
 Dasho Ugyen Tsechup (b. 1964).
 Dasho Topgay (b. 1966).

Her five sisters are (three of them are the other Queen Mothers):

 Ashi Beda (b. 1951).
 HM Ashi Dorji Wangmo (b. 1955).
 HM Ashi Tshering Pem (b. 1957).
 HM Ashi Tshering Yangdon (b. 1959), mother of King Jigme Khesar Namgyel Wangchuck.
 Ashi Sonam Choden (b. 1969).

Sangay Choden was appointed the United Nations Population Fund’s (UNFPA) Goodwill Ambassador in Bhutan in 1999.

Sangay Choden is particularly interested in promoting the arts in Bhutan and advocating the country's rich cultural heritage. She is the patron of the Bhutan Textile Museum in Thimphu which she helped establish in 2001.

Her Majesty also established the Tara Lhadron Zhingkham Lhakhang, a temple dedicated to the 21 Taras located in the historically and spiritually significant temple grounds of Parigzampa Astrology School in Dechencholing, Thimphu.

On 1 July 2011 she visited the Alhambra with her daughter, Princess Ashi Euphelma Choden Wangchuck.

Children 
She had, with the former king, the following children:

Patronages 
 Royal Patron of the Bhutan Textile Museum.
 Chairman of the Royal Textile Academy of Bhutan (RTAB).
 Founder and President of RENEW (Respect, Educate, Nurture and Empower Women) since 2004.
 Goodwill Ambassador for UNFPA since 1999.
 President of the Gyalyum (Queen Mother) Charitable Trust.

Honours 
  :
  United Nations Population Award (Individual Category, 10 December 2020).

See also
 House of Wangchuck
 Line of succession to the Bhutanese throne

References

Notes

External links 
 Bhutan News Online
 World Who's Who

Bhutanese monarchy
1963 births
Living people
Queen mothers
Wangchuck dynasty